Liao Li ( 209–234), courtesy name Gongyuan, was an official of the state of Shu Han during the Three Kingdoms period of China.

Service under Liu Bei
Liao Li was from Linyuan County, Wuling Commandery, which is located within present-day Changde, Hunan. He started his career under the warlord Liu Bei around 209 after Liu Bei succeeded Liu Qi as the Governor of Jing Province. Liu Bei employed Liao Li, who was then below the age of 30, as an assistant officer and later appointed him as the Administrator of Changsha Commandery.

In 211, when Liu Bei led his troops to Yi Province (covering present-day Sichuan and Chongqing), he left his chief adviser Zhuge Liang behind to take charge of his territories in Jing Province during his absence. During this time, Liu Bei's ally Sun Quan sent a representative to meet Zhuge Liang and ask him to recommend scholar-officials who were well-versed in managing a state. Zhuge Liang replied: "Pang Tong and Liao Li are talents from Jing Province. They are capable of assisting me in governing a state."

In 215, when tensions ran high between Liu Bei and Sun Quan over a territorial dispute in Jing Province, Sun Quan ordered his general Lü Meng to lead troops to seize three commanderies in southern Jing Province. During this time, Liao Li abandoned his post at Changsha Commandery and fled west to Chengdu, the capital of Yi Province, to join Liu Bei. As Liu Bei highly regarded Liao Li, he did not blame him for losing Changsha and instead reassigned him to serve as the Administrator of Ba Commandery (巴郡; covering parts of present-day Chongqing).

In 219, after Liu Bei seized control of Hanzhong Commandery and declared himself King of Hanzhong, he appointed Liao Li as a Palace Attendant.

Service under Liu Shan
Following Liu Bei's death in 223, his son Liu Shan succeeded him as the next emperor of the state of Shu. After his coronation, Liu Shan appointed Liao Li as a Changshui Colonel.

Liao Li had all along thought highly of himself and believed that he was on par with Zhuge Liang, the Imperial Chancellor of Shu, in terms of talent and fame. However, after he realised that his status in the Shu government was actually lower than that of the general Li Yan and others, he became very unhappy.

Defamation incident
On one occasion, when Zhuge Liang's assistants Li Shao and Jiang Wan came to discuss something with him, he told them: 

Li Shao and Jiang Wan reported Liao Li to Zhuge Liang, who then wrote a memorial to the emperor Liu Shan as follows: 

Zhuge Liang also wrote:

Downfall and exile
The Shu emperor Liu Shan issued an edict as follows: 

Liao Li was removed from office and reduced to the status of a commoner. He and his family were exiled to Wenshan Commandery (汶山郡; around present-day Mao County, Sichuan), where they lived as peasants and sustained themselves by farming. In 234, when he received news of Zhuge Liang's death, he shed tears and cried: "I now have to live the rest of my life like a zuoren!"

Some years later, when the Shu general Jiang Wei passed by Wenshan Commandery, he visited Liao Li and saw that the latter was still the proud and ambitious man he was, and that he remained calm and composed when he spoke. Liao Li died in an unknown year in Wenshan. After his death, his wife and children were pardoned and allowed to return to the Shu capital Chengdu.

See also
 Lists of people of the Three Kingdoms

Notes

References

 Chen, Shou (3rd century). Records of the Three Kingdoms (Sanguozhi).
 
 Pei, Songzhi (5th century). Annotations to Records of the Three Kingdoms (Sanguozhi zhu).
 

Year of birth unknown
Year of death unknown
Shu Han politicians
Politicians from Changde
Political office-holders in Hunan
Political office-holders in Chongqing
Officials under Liu Bei